Rhett Lashlee (born June 9, 1983) is an American college football coach who is the head coach at Southern Methodist University in Dallas, Texas. He previously served as the offensive coordinator and quarterbacks coach at the University of Miami from 2020 to 2021.

Lashlee played college football at the University of Arkansas as a quarterback from 2002 to 2004. Prior to his tenure at SMU, he held various assistant coaching positions at Springdale High School in Springdale, Arkansas, the University of Arkansas, Auburn University, Samford University, Arkansas State University, University of Connecticut, SMU and the University of Miami.

Playing career

High school
Lashlee attended Shiloh Christian School in Springdale, Arkansas, where he played quarterback under head coach Gus Malzahn.  Lashlee posted a state-record 40 career wins (40–3–2 as a starter) and he led his team to three straight state championship games, winning two titles.

Lashlee holds a number of Arkansas high school records.
 858 career completions (#9 nationally)
 13,201 career passing yards (#6 nationally)
 171 career touchdown passes (#3 nationally)
 546 pass attempts in a season (#6 nationally)
 44 completions in a game (#8 nationally)
 71 pass attempts in a game (#7 nationally)
 672 passing yards in a game (#2 nationally)

Regarded as a three-star recruit by Rivals.com, Lashlee was ranked as the No. 19 pro-style quarterback in a 2002 class that also featured Ben Olson, Trent Edwards, Drew Stanton, and Matt Moore.

College
Lashlee played college football for the Arkansas Razorbacks.  Lashlee was a backup quarterback to Matt Jones, from 2002 to 2004 for the Razorbacks. A shoulder injury ended his playing career. Lashlee graduated from the University of Arkansas in 2006.

Coaching career

Early career
Prior to 2017, Lashlee is from Gus Malzahn coaching tree and worked under him for his entire career with the exception of his one year at Samford University.

From 2004 to 2005, Lashlee worked with the quarterbacks at Springdale High School. Following the announcement of Malzahn's hire as Arkansas Razorbacks offensive coordinator in 2006, Lashlee was hired as an offensive graduate assistant. Following this season, Malzahn left to become the offensive coordinator of the Tulsa Golden Hurricane football team. Although invited to join Malzahn's staff at Tulsa, Lashlee left coaching and remained in Northwest Arkansas. Instead, Lashlee and his brother in law wrote, published, and marketed High School Sports The Magazine (later renamed Vype), a publication based on high school sports in Arkansas. During the two years Lashlee was involved in the business, he made relationships with high school coaches throughout Arkansas and marketed his magazine to distributors. Lashlee volunteered as quarterbacks coach at Har-Ber High School when his schedule would allow. Malzahn was hired as the offensive coordinator at Auburn for the 2009 season. Following this announcement, Malzahn offered Lashlee to join his staff as a graduate assistant, returning Lashlee to coaching.

Samford
In 2011, Lashlee joined Samford University as their offensive coordinator and quarterbacks coach. During his first and only season at Samford, Lashlee improved the team's offense in points per game (17 to 26), total offense (57 to 46 ranking nationally), and improved their record from 4–6 to 6–5 through the installation of a high tempo offense.

Arkansas State
In 2012, Lashlee was hired by Arkansas State University as their offensive coordinator and quarterbacks coach following head coach Gus Malzahn after his departure from Auburn.

Auburn
On December 6, 2012, Lashlee was hired at Auburn University as their offensive coordinator and quarterbacks coach following Gus Malzahn after his return to Auburn after one year at Arkansas State. In 2013, Lashlee was a finalist for the Broyles Award, given annually to the nation's top college football assistant coach.

UConn
In 2017, Lashlee joined the University of Connecticut as their offensive coordinator and quarterbacks coach.

SMU
On January 4, 2018, Lashlee was hired as the offensive coordinator and quarterbacks coach at Southern Methodist University (SMU).

Miami
On January 3, 2020, Lashlee was hired as the offensive coordinator and quarterbacks coach at the University of Miami under head coach Manny Diaz.

SMU (second stint)
On November 30, 2021, Lashlee was named head coach at Southern Methodist University (SMU), replacing Sonny Dykes after his departure to become the head coach at Texas Christian University (TCU).

In his inaugural season, Lashlee became the first SMU head coach since Bobby Collins in 1982 to have a winning season and qualify for a bowl game.

Personal life
Rhett Lashlee is married to Lauren Lashlee (née Lee), and they have four children together: twin sons, Thomas and Hudson, and twin daughters, Rowyn and Scarlet.

Head coaching record

See also
 2006 Arkansas Razorbacks football team
 2011 Samford Bulldogs football team

References

External links
 SMU profile
 Miami (FL) profile

1983 births
Living people
American football quarterbacks
Arkansas Razorbacks football players
Arkansas State Red Wolves football coaches
Auburn Tigers football coaches
Miami Hurricanes football coaches
Samford Bulldogs football coaches
SMU Mustangs football coaches
UConn Huskies football coaches
High school football coaches in Arkansas
People from Springdale, Arkansas
Coaches of American football from Arkansas
Players of American football from Arkansas